"Tip of My Tongue" is a song by Australian rock musician Diesel. It was included on his debut album, Hepfidelity (1992). Released in 1992, the song peaked at number four in Australia and number three in New Zealand. At the ARIA Music Awards of 1993, the song was nominated for ARIA Award for Single of the Year, but it lost to "The Day You Went Away" by Wendy Matthews.

Track listings
Australian CD single
 "Tip of My Tongue" – 4:12
 "Rear View Mirror" – 5:12

European maxi-CD single
 "Tip of My Tongue" – 4:12
 "Come to Me" – 4:22
 "One Thing After Another" – 5:03

Vinyl
 "Tip of My Tongue" – 4:12
 "Tell the Truth"

Charts

Weekly charts

Year-end charts

References

External links

Chrysalis Records singles
1992 singles
1991 songs
Diesel (musician) songs
Songs written by Diesel (musician)